VAH-16, nicknamed the White Blades, was a short-lived Heavy Attack Squadron of the U.S. Navy, based at NAS North Island, California. The squadron flew the North American AJ Savage aircraft.

The squadron was established on 15 January 1958. On 13 Jun it established Detachment A in Hawaii and then relocated it to NAS Agana, Guam, with four AJ-2 aircraft. On 1 Jul 1958, its primary mission of heavy attack high altitude bombing was changed to that of aerial refueling. The squadron was disestablished on 30 January 1959.

See also
 History of the United States Navy
 List of inactive United States Navy aircraft squadrons

References

Heavy attack squadrons of the United States Navy
Wikipedia articles incorporating text from the Dictionary of American Naval Aviation Squadrons